Suad Karajica (22 November 1959 – 13 April 2020) was a Bosnian luger. He competed for Yugoslavia in the men's singles event at the 1984 Winter Olympics.

References

External links
 

1959 births
2020 deaths
Bosnia and Herzegovina male lugers
Olympic lugers of Yugoslavia
Lugers at the 1984 Winter Olympics
Sportspeople from Sarajevo